Ang Panday is a 2009 Filipino action fantasy film adapted from Carlo J. Caparas' Panday comics. Directed by Rico Gutierrez and Mac Alejandre, it stars Ramon "Bong" Revilla, Phillip Salvador and Iza Calzado. It was released on December 25, 2009. The movie was produced by GMA Pictures.

Revilla previously starred as a version of the title character, Flavio the blacksmith, in the film Dugo ng Panday (1993). Phillip Salvador, who plays the antagonist Lizardo, portrayed Flavio in a television series adaptation of Ang Panday (2005).

Plot
Long ago, the evil wizard Lizardo (Phillip Salvador) sent an army of monsters to subjugate the land and its people. Lizardo succeeded, but a prophecy tells of a comet that will fall to Earth, and a man who will wield a weapon that will free the people from Lizardo's tyranny. Flavio (Bong Revilla Jr.) is a blacksmith content with living a quiet, uneventful life in a town mostly untouched by Lizardo's evil. But when the comet of prophecy lands on the outskirts of town, Flavio's destiny is immediately made clear. Around the peace-loving but brave Flavio. His arch-enemy Lizardo attempts to ruin the peace and harmony of their dwelling place, affecting the inhabitants. Moreover, the evil warlord challenges Flavio by capturing his beautiful lady love Maria (Iza Calzado). A series of events take place, bringing the blacksmith (panday) at the forefront of a full-blown war against Lizardo's troops.

Cast
Ramon "Bong" Revilla as Flavio
Phillip Salvador as Lizardo 
Iza Calzado as Maria
Geoff Eigenmann as Celso
Robert Villar as Bugoy 
Rhian Ramos as Emelita
Sheena Halili as Dahlia
Carlene Aguilar as Teresa / Mananaggal
George Estregan Jr. as Apoykatawan
Pekto
Dan Fernandez
Mat Ranillo III
Benjie Paras as Zanboro
John Lapus as Kruma
Paulo Avelino as Pepe 
Stef Prescott as Ditas 
Bj Forbes as Popoy 
Luz Valdez as Lola Mameng
Joonee Gamboa as Lolo Isko
Carlos Morales as Diego
Gladys Guevarra as Babang 
JB Magsaysay  as Benito
King Gutierrez as Kubada
Dindo Arroyo as Cruzaldo
Marissa Sanchez as Miling
John Feir as Utal
Carlo Lacana as Young Flavio
Ace Espinosa as Flavio's father
Rey Sagum as Hugo
Banjo Romero as Kumar
Ambet Nabus as Miling's son
Anne Curtis as Dyosa Adora

Production
Shooting for the film was done in Ilocos Norte.

Home media
Ang Panday was released onto DVD and VCD by VIVA Video. The DVD release includes the full-length trailer of the film. The DVD/VCD was released on March 11, 2010.

Sequel

The film's sequel was released as an official entry to the 2011 Metro Manila Film Festival. The sequel was directed by Mac Alejandre and featured returning stars, Ramon "Bong" Revilla, Iza Calzado and Phillip Salvador along with a new character played by Marian Rivera.

Awards

35th Metro Manila Film Festival Awards

References

External links

Panday
2009 films
Philippine fantasy adventure films
Films based on Philippine comics
Films shot in Ilocos Norte
GMA Pictures films
Live-action films based on comics
Philippine films based on comics
Films directed by Mac Alejandre